Heiner Thiel (born January 14, 1957) is a German sculptor and curator. He is an exponent of concrete art.

Life 
Thiel studied history of art from 1978 to 1982 at the Johannes Gutenberg University in Mainz, and then went to the Städelschule in Frankfurt from 1983 to 1985. There he studied sculpture under . In 1985 he received an award for most promising artist in visual arts of the town of Mainz. The following year he won the most promising award of the federal state of Rhineland-Palatinate. In 1998 Thiel was awarded a scholarship by the  – .

Work 

Heiner Thiel works with a variety of sculptural materials. In the 1970s he was fascinated by bronze casting, but in the 1980s he began to experiment with steel sheets, which he pretreated in a complex painting process. He then formed these steel sheets into abstract wall reliefs. Depending on the angle of view, one seems to see a different object, parts of the relief appear in the foreground or disappear, bring out the illusions of perception and thus invite reflection on the theme of perspective.

Thiel designed similar works in the 1990s with his cube-like wall objects made of Metal. Here too, the perspective changes with the viewer's movement in front of the work: «You can observe how the perspective space gradually unfolds until it reaches its optimum form and depth during the shift in position« (in German: «Man kann während der Positionsverschiebung beobachten, wie sich der perspektivische Raum sukzessive entfaltet, bis er seine optimale Form und Tiefe erreicht hat.«)

The game with the different perspectives revolves around the central question in Thiel's work: «In my artistic work, I am particularly interested in the' border area' between surface, space and colour: when does a space become a space? And what role does color play in this?« (in German: «In meiner künstlerischen Arbeit interessiert mich besonders der 'Grenzbereich' zwischen Fläche, Raum und Farbe: wann wird eine Fläche räumlich und wann ein Körper flächig? Und welche Rolle spielt dabei die Farbe?«)

Color forms one of the central themes in Thiel's more recent works and adds the dimension of light or shadow to the interplay with perspectives, thus creating new experiences of perception for the viewer. At the end of the 1990s, works of aluminium sheet metal were created, which were either concave or convex in shape and provided with a paint application. The paint is applied by anodising and is only 20 thousandths of a mm thick. The production and pre-processing of the aluminium sheets is also carried out industrially, they are parts of large ball elements that are needed for the industry.

Michael Post characterizes this technique:«The method of anodizing allows the creation of colorfulness without the material substance of color becoming visible.« (in German: «Die Methode des Eloxierens gestattet die Herstellung von Farbigkeit, ohne dass die materielle Substanz der Farbe sichtbar wird.«) Once again, Thiel focuses on the viewer's perceptions in these works: viewed from a distance, the concave or convex element of the work loses itself and the work appears like an ordinary square with normal edges. However, when you look from the side, the work begins to emerge from the wall and the curvature becomes overly clear. In addition, the lighting of the values has an influence on perception, the shadow cast by the respective work becomes part of the mystery picture of perception. Hans Zitko writes:«In this event, the objects gain the character of phantoms, which are able to change their form and structure under the glances of the subject«. (in German: «In diesem Geschehen gewinnen die Objekte verschiedentlich den Charakter von Phantomen, die ihre Form und Struktur unter den Blicken des Subjekts zu verändern vermögen.«)

Collections 
 Bundeskunstsammlung, Berlin, Deutschland 
 Albright-Knox Art Gallery, Buffalo, United States 
 Art collection of the Deutsche Bank, Frankfurt, Germany
 Art collection of the Deutsche Bundesbank, Frankfurt, Germany
 Art collection of the Union Investment, Frankfurt, Germany
  ("museum of concrete art"), Ingolstadt, Germany
 , Kaiserslautern, Germany
 Landesmuseum Mainz, Mainz, Germany
 Ministry of Education, Science, Youth and Culture of the Federal State Rhineland-Palatinate, Germany
 State Chancellery of the Federal State Rhineland-Palatinate, Mainz, Germany
 Kunsthalle Mannheim, Mannheim, Germany
  ("museum of non-objective art"),  Otterndorf, Germany
 Art collection of Maximilian und Agathe Weishaupt, München, Germany

Solo exhibitions 

 2000: Heiner Thiel - New Works, Charlotte Jackson Fine Art, Newport Beach, USA
 2004: Heiner Thiel – Linie – Fläche – Farbe – Raum, Haus Metternich, Koblenz, Germany 
 2008: La Vérité Tordue de L'éspace, Imprints Galerie, Piégros-la-Clastre, France
 2009: Oktahedron, Galerie Lindner, Wien, Austria
 2016: La Surface de la Couleur, édition multiples un, Paris, France
 2016: Heiner Thiel, Imprints Galerie, Crest, Drôme, France
 2017: Heiner Thiel – Werkschau 40 Jahre,  Museum Wilhelm Morgner, Sammlung Schroth Soest, Germany

Group exhibitions
 2008: Works on Paper, Natalie and Irving Forman Collection, Albright-Knox Art Gallery, Buffalo, USA  
 2008: Im Blickpunkt: Skulptur, Kunsthalle Mannheim, Mannheim, Germany 
 2012: Heiner Thiel – Matthew Tyson, Emma Hill Fine Art-The Eagle Gallery, London, England
 2013: Embodying Colour, Museum Wiesbaden, Germany 
 2014: Embodying Colour, Budapest, Vasarely Museum, Hungary 
 2015: Schwarz auf Weiss, Highlights aus der Sammlung Maximilian und Agathe Weishaupt und der Stiftung für Konkrete Kunst und Design, Museum für Konkrete Kunst (Highlights of the Collection of Maximilian and Agathe Weishaupt and the Foundation for Conrete Art and Design of the Museum of Concrete Art), Ingolstadt, Germany
 2017: Power Play, Charlotte Jackson Fine Art, Santa Fe, United States
 2018: Ecken und Kanten – Edges and Ridges, Galerie Renate Bender, München, Germany
 2018: Stefan Forler, Heiner Thiel: Plastische Objekte, Kunstverein Pirmasens, Germany
 2019: Mostly blue, Charlotte Kackson Fine Art, Santa Fe, United Nations
 2019: Embodying Colour V, Sammlung Schroth at the Museum–Wilhelm-Morgner, Soest, Germany
 2019: Form und Farbe. Kabinettausstellung Tatsushi Kawanabe, Gert Riel, Heiner Thiel (Form and Color. Cabinet exhibition of Tatsushi Kwanabe, Gert Riel, Heiner Thiel), Galerie Linde Hollinger, Ladenburg,Germany
 2019: Expositie Stephan Siebers en Heiner Thiel (Exhibition Stephan Siebers and Heiner Thiel), Broft Galerie, Leerdam, The Netherlands
 2020: Punkt und Linie zur Fläche – frei nach Kandinsky, Galerie Renate Bender, Munich, Germany
 2020: Channeling The Baroque: A Group Exhibition, Charlotte Jackson Fine Art Galerie, Santa Fe, United States

Art in public places 

 Without year: Eternal Light (Ewiges Licht), Festungskirche Ehrenbreitstein
 1996: Offenes Quadrat, Skulpturenweg Rheinland-Pfalz, Germany
 2000: Large sculpture Labyrinth, elementary school in Mainz-Bretzenheim, Germany
 2000: Large sculpture Maze, elementary school in Gerlenhofen, Germany
 2003: Design and configuration of a huge glass mural with coat of arms in the Coat of Arms-Hall of the Landtag Rhineland-Palatinate, Germany (together with Michael Post) (temporary installation)
 2005: Mural Politeia in the foyer of the police headquarters, Westpfalz, Kaiserslautern, Germany (with Michael Post)
 2006: Design and configuration of a second huge glass mural in the Landtag Rhineland-Palatinate, Salle d'Amitié, the coat of arms of the twin towns and regions of Rhineland-Palatinate, Germany (with Michael Post)
 2009: Mural in the office of the regional premier of Rhineland-Palatinate in the State Chancellery Rhineland-Palatinate, Mainz, Germany
 2022: Together with the artist Michael Post: Graphic painting at the bridging houses of the Bad Kreuznach police station

Curatorial work 
 2013: Curator of the exhibition Embodying Colour at the Kunsthalle Wiesbaden (with Heiner Thiel)
 2014: Curator of the exhibition Embodying Colour Vasarely Museum, Budapest, Hungary 
 2015: Curator of the exhibition Embodying Colour at Haus Metternich, Koblenz, Germany (with Michael Post)
 2019: Embodying Colour V, Sammlung Schroth at the Museum–Wilhelm-Morgner, Soest, Germany
 2021: Curated by… Heiner Thiel: Die Verkörperung der Farbe, Galerie Renate Bender, Munich, Germany

References

Further reading 
 Michael Post und Heiner Thiel (Hrsg.): Embodying Colour. Mit Beiträgen von u. a. Matthias Bleyl, Invar-Torre Hollaus, Urs Bugmann, Hans Zitko.  Katalog zur Ausstellung in der Kunsthalle Wiesbaden, 18. Oktober bis 15 Dezember 2013, Ippenschied 2013, 
 Michael Post und Heiner Thiel (Hrsg.): Embodying Colour. Mit Beiträgen von u.a. Marcia Hafif, Dóra Maurer, Peter Fitz. Katalog zur Ausstellung im Vasarely Museum, 9. Oktober 2014 bis 11. Januar 2015, Ippenschied 2014, 
 Ruth Martius (Hrsg.): Die krumme Wahrheit des Raums. Katalog zur Ausstellung Der krumme Raum, 5. November bis 22. Dezember 2007 im Kunstbüroberlin, Bremen 2007, Verlag Hachmannedition, 
 Ulrike Schuck: Heiner Thiel. Arbeiten 1987–1989, Verlag: Galerie-Dorothea-van-der-Koelen, Mainz 1989,

External links 

 Heiner Thiel at artfacts.net
 Heiner Thiel at kunstaspekte.art
 Webseite of Heiner Thiel
 Catalog of the exhibition Neuzugänge: Farben – Colours at the Sammlung Schroth 22. June until 11. August 2013
 
 Website of the artist Heiner Thiel

Concrete art
1957 births
20th-century German sculptors
20th-century German male artists
German male sculptors
Living people